This article provides a collection of the etymologies of the names of the states of Mexico.

References

Mexico
Etymology

es:Toponimia de los estados de México